Villacis is a surname. Notable people with the surname include:

 Eduardo Villacis (born 1979), Major League Baseball pitcher
 Aníbal Villacís (1927–2012), Ecuadorian painter
 Belisario Villacís (1899–?), Ecuadorian long-distance runner